Dongsheng is a town situated at the northern periphery of the city of Zhongshan, Guangdong province. The population of Dongsheng has  residents.

 is a station on the Guangzhou–Zhuhai intercity railway serving the town.

See also
Shatian dialect

External links
Dongsheng Government Website

Zhongshan
Towns in Guangdong